Pa Dali (also called Pa Dalih) is a Kelabit settlement in the Marudi division of Sarawak, Malaysia.

It lies on the so-called Bario loop, the most popular 3-day trek in the Bario area, which passes through the Kelabit villages of Pa Dalih, Pa Ramadu and Pa Mada, and is described as a friendly and hospitable village.

It was reported in 1974 that an ancient burial ground with stone urns, slab graves and porcelain urns was found at about 3300 feet near Pa Dali. At the time, the village was uninhabited following its evacuation during the Indonesia–Malaysia confrontation of 1962–1966.

Neighbouring settlements include:

References

Villages in Sarawak